Taís Rochel (born 16 October 1983) is a Brazilian fencer. She competed in the women's foil event at the 2016 Summer Olympics. In the first round, she defeated Saudi Arabian Lubna Al-Omair by the score of 15-0. The match took 1 minute and 44 seconds.

References

External links
 

1993 births
Living people
Brazilian female foil fencers
Olympic fencers of Brazil
Fencers at the 2016 Summer Olympics
Place of birth missing (living people)
Fencers at the 2015 Pan American Games
21st-century Brazilian women